Arbelodes goellnerae is a moth in the family Cossidae. It is found in southern Namibia.

References

Natural History Museum Lepidoptera generic names catalog

Moths described in 2012
Endemic fauna of Namibia
Metarbelinae
Moths of Africa